The 1937 All-Southern Conference football team consists of American football players chosen by the Associated Press (AP) and United Press (UP) for the All-Southern Conference football team for the 1937 college football season.

All-Southern Conference selections

Backs
 Crowell Little, North Carolina (AP-1)
 Paul Shu, VMI (AP-1)
 Jim Meade, Maryland (AP-1)
 Elmore Hackney, Duke (AP-1)

Ends
 Andy Bershak, North Carolina (AP-1)
 Herb Hudgins, Duke (AP-1)

Tackles
 Henry Barton, North Carolina (AP-1)
 Joe Brunansky, Duke (AP-1)

Guards
 Elmer Wrenn, North Carolina (AP-1)
 Woody Lipscomb, Duke (AP-1)

Centers
 Charlie Woods, Clemson (AP-1)

Key
AP = Associated Press

UP = United Press

See also
1937 College Football All-America Team

References

All-Southern Conference football team
All-Southern Conference football teams